The 2014–15 season is the 126th season of competitive football in the Netherlands.

Promotion and relegation

Pre-season

National teams

Netherlands national football team

2014 FIFA World Cup

UEFA Euro 2016 qualifying

International Friendlies

Netherlands women's national football team

2015 FIFA Women's World Cup qualification (UEFA)

Play-offs
Semifinal

Final

League season

Eredivisie

Eerste divisie

Winners by period
 First period (Weeks 1–9): N.E.C.

Topklasse

Hoofdklasse

Women's BeNe League

Managerial changes

Diary of the season

Deaths
 13 July 2014: Joop van Basten (84), Professional football player, father of Marco van Basten
 24 July 2014: Cees Heerschop (79), former PSV and N.E.C. defender.
 20 September 2014: Erwin Sparendam (80)
 28 September 2014: Joop Pattiselanno (79)
 9 October 2014: Frans van Tuijl (89)
 13 October 2014: Wally Jansen (69)
 29 October 2014: Klas Ingesson, 46, former Sweden and PSV midfielder.

Retirements

References

 
Seasons in Dutch football